Richard David Wolff (born April 1, 1942) is an American Marxian economist known for his work on economic methodology and class analysis. He is a professor emeritus of economics at the University of Massachusetts Amherst and a visiting professor in the graduate program in international affairs of the New School. Wolff has also taught economics at Yale University, City University of New York, University of Utah, University of Paris I (Sorbonne), and The Brecht Forum in New York City.

In 1988 Wolff co-founded the journal Rethinking Marxism. In 2010 he published Capitalism Hits the Fan: The Global Economic Meltdown and What to Do About It, also released on DVD. In 2012 he released three new books: Occupy the Economy: Challenging Capitalism, with David Barsamian (San Francisco: City Lights Books), Contending Economic Theories: Neoclassical, Keynesian, and Marxian, with Stephen Resnick, and Democracy at Work (Chicago: Haymarket Books). In 2019 he released his book Understanding Marxism.

Wolff hosts the weekly 30-minute-long program, Economic Update, which is produced by the non-profit Democracy at Work, which he co-founded. Economic Update is on YouTube, FreeSpeech TV, WBAI-FM in New York City (Pacifica Radio), CUNY TV (WNYE-DT3), and available as a podcast. Wolff is featured regularly in television, print, and internet media. The New York Times Magazine has named him "America's most prominent Marxist economist". Wolff lives in Manhattan with his wife and frequent collaborator, Harriet Fraad, a practicing psychotherapist.

Early life and education 
To escape Nazism, Wolff's parents emigrated from Europe to the United States during World War II. His father, a French lawyer working until that point in Cologne, Germany, gained employment as a steelworker in Youngstown, Ohio (in part because his European certification was not recognized in the United States), and the family eventually settled outside New York City. His mother was a German citizen. Wolff's father was acquainted with Max Horkheimer. Wolff states that his European background influenced his world view: 
"[E]verything you expect about how the world works probably will be changed in your life, that unexpected things happen, often tragic things happen, and being flexible, being aware of a whole range of different things that happen in the world, is not just a good idea as a thinking person, but it's crucial to your survival. So, for me, I grew up convinced that understanding the political and economic environment I lived in was an urgent matter that had to be done, and made me a little different from many of my fellow kids in school who didn't have that sense of the urgency of understanding how the world worked to be able to navigate an unstable and often dangerous world. That was a very important lesson for me."

Wolff earned a Bachelor of Arts, magna cum laude, in history from Harvard College in 1963 and moved on to Stanford University, where he attained an Master of Arts in economics in 1964, to study with Paul A. Baran. Baran died prematurely from a heart attack in 1964 and Wolff transferred to Yale University, where he received a second master's degree in economics in 1966, a Master of Arts in history in 1967, and a Doctor of Philosophy in economics in 1969. As a graduate student at Yale, Wolff worked as an instructor. His dissertation, "Economic Aspects of British Colonialism in Kenya, 1895–1930", was eventually published in book form in 1974.

Academic career 
Wolff taught at the City College of New York from 1969 to 1973. Here he started his lifelong collaboration with fellow economist Stephen Resnick, who arrived in 1971 after being denied tenure at Yale for signing an anti-war petition. Both would then be part, along with Samuel Bowles, Herbert Gintis, and Rick Edwards, of the "radical package" that was hired in 1973 by the Economics Department at the University of Massachusetts Amherst, where Wolff has been full professor since 1981. Wolff retired in 2008 but remains professor emeritus and that year joined The New School as a visiting professor.

The first co-authored academic publication by Wolff and Resnick was "The Theory of Transitional Conjunctures and the Transition from Feudalism to Capitalism," which laid out the pillars of the framework that they have worked on ever since. They formulated a non-determinist, class-analytical approach for understanding the debates regarding the transition from feudalism to capitalism. Their topics have included Marxian theory and value analysis, overdetermination, radical economics, international trade, business cycles, social formations, the Soviet Union, and comparing and contrasting Marxian and non-Marxian economic theories.

Wolff's work with Resnick took Louis Althusser and Étienne Balibar's Reading Capital as its point of departure and developed a subtle reading of Karl Marx's Capital Volumes II and III in their influential Knowledge and Class. For the authors, Marxian class analysis entails the detailed study of the conditions of existences of concrete forms of performance, appropriation, and distribution of surplus labor. While there could be an infinite number of forms of surplus appropriation, the Marxist canon refers to ancient (independent), slave, feudal, capitalist, and communist class processes.

In 1989, Wolff joined efforts with a group of colleagues, ex- and then current students to launch Rethinking Marxism, an academic journal that aims to create a platform for rethinking and developing Marxian concepts and theories within economics as well as other fields of social inquiry. For more than two decades, he served as a member of the editorial board of the journal. Currently, he continues to serve as a member of the advisory board of the journal.

Wolff was a visiting professor in spring 1994 at University of Paris 1 Pantheon-Sorbonne. Wolff continues to teach graduate seminars and undergraduate courses and direct dissertation research in economics at the University of Massachusetts Amherst and, most recently, in the graduate program in international affairs (GPIA) at The New School.

A founding member of the Green Party of New Haven, Connecticut, Wolff was the party's mayoral candidate in 1985. In 2011, he called for the establishment of a broad-based left-wing mass party in the United States. Wolff, especially since 2008, gives many public lectures throughout the United States and other countries. He is regular lecturer at the Brecht Forum. Wolff is often a guest on television and radio news programs, and, within the U.S., has appeared on a variety of programs, as well as writing for a number of publications and websites. Wolff hosts a weekly radio/TV show and podcast on economics and society, Economic Update, at WBAI in New York City.

One of his students, George Papandreou, became Prime Minister of Greece serving from 2009 to 2011. Wolff remembers Papandreou as a student who "sought then to become both a sophisticated and a socialist economist." However, CUNY Economics professor Costas Panayotakis observed that "after being elected Greek prime minister in the fall of 2009 on a platform that excoriated austerity as the wrong kind of policy to be adopted at a time of deep economic crisis, George Papandreou has reversed himself and, faced with a debt crisis, called in the International Monetary Fund and imposed the most brutal austerity program the country has ever seen."

Projects 
Wolff is a co-founder of Democracy at Work, a non-profit that produces media and live events opposing capitalism and promoting workplace democracy. The organization is based on his 2012 book, Democracy at Work: A Cure for Capitalism. Wolff also hosts the nationally syndicated program Economic Update with Richard D. Wolff, which is produced by Democracy at Work.

Personal life 
In addition to his native English, Wolff is fluent in French and German. Wolff lives in New York City with his wife, Harriet Fraad, a psychotherapist. They have two children.

Wolff is a distant relative of German political activist Wilhelm Wolff, to whom the first volume of Karl Marx's Das Kapital was dedicated.

Works

Films

References

External links 

 
 Democracy@Work, a YouTube series hosted by Richard Wolff
 Richard D. Wolff's UMASS webpage (with Stephen A Resnick)
 Wolff's faculty profile at The New School
 Rethinking Marxism: A Journal of Economics, Culture and Society
 Democracy at Work A social movement "for greater economic democracy" co-founded by Dr. Wolff

Interviews

 
 Capitalism in Crisis: Richard Wolff Urges End to Austerity, New Jobs Program, Democratizing Work. Democracy Now! March 25, 2013.
 The Empire Files: Understanding Marxism and Socialism with Richard Wolff. The Real News, March 21, 2016.
 Poverty Has Always Accompanied Capitalism. Truthout. July 3, 2016.

1942 births
20th-century American economists
Economists from New York (state)
American people of French descent
American people of German descent
American Marxists
American communists
American anti-capitalists
City College of New York faculty
Harvard College alumni
Living people
Marxian economists
Marxist theorists
American Marxist writers
New York (state) socialists
Members of the Democratic Socialists of America
Stanford University alumni
The New School faculty
University of Massachusetts Amherst faculty
Writers from Youngstown, Ohio
Yale Graduate School of Arts and Sciences alumni
Economists from Ohio
21st-century American economists